The 1993 Ginebra San Miguel season was the 15th season of the franchise in the Philippine Basketball Association (PBA).

Summary
The Ginebras won their first game of the season by defeating 7-Up in the main game of the opening twinbill in the league's new home at Cuneta Astrodome. The Gins would lose five in a row and then won their last four games of the eliminations in the All-Filipino Cup to make it to the quarterfinal round where they dropped all their four matches.    

Brian Gilgeous was Ginebra’s first choice for their import in the Commissioner’s Cup, he was sent home even before the second conference started. Coming in to replaced him is Tony Massop, the number one draft pick in the Continental Basketball League in 1991. After leading the Gins to two victories in four games, Massop refused to play in their next game upon discovering that a certain import Eric Meeks, a recommendee by retired Ginebra cager Francis Arnaiz, was present and brought in secretly to try out for the team. Massop left and packed his bags as the Gins played the San Miguel Beermen without an import and were fined P50,000. Brian Shorter plane in and played four games, but after a lackluster performance in Ginebra's 91-97 loss to winless Sta.Lucia Realtors in Dumaguete City on July 17, Shorter left the squad without giving notice, sources said he was reprimanded by coach Jaworski after the game, prompting him to sneak out of the country. Ginebra was almost out of contention for a semis berth when they played their last two games with their fifth reinforcement Benny Bolton, who used his islam name Benjamin Muhammad.

In the Governor’s Cup, Darryl McDonald was found to be over the height limit. Terry Thames arrived and measured just in time for Ginebra's first game against Alaska. Thames was impressive in scoring 40 points despite the Gins’ 98-102 loss to the Milkmen.  They won their next game against Shell Helix, 109-101 in Davao City on October 2, but lost their remaining eight assignments in the eliminations for a dismal season.

Roster

Transactions

Trades

Additions

Recruited imports

References

Barangay Ginebra San Miguel seasons